Turnbow is a surname. Notable people with the surname include:

Derrick Turnbow (born 1978), American baseball player
Donna Turnbow (born c. 1961), American artistic gymnast
Guy Turnbow (1908–1975), American football player
Hartman Turnbow (1905–1988), American civil rights figure
Holice Turnbow (born 1930), American quilter